Linas Banys (born 6 April 1998) is a Lithuanian biathlete who competes at the Biathlon World Cup.

Banys was shortlisted to represent Lithuania at the 2022 Winter Olympics.

Biathlon results
All results are sourced from the International Biathlon Union.

World Championships
0 medals

*During Olympic seasons competitions are only held for those events not included in the Olympic program.
**The single mixed relay was added as an event in 2019.

References

1998 births
Living people
Lithuanian male biathletes
Biathletes at the 2016 Winter Youth Olympics
Biathletes at the 2022 Winter Olympics
Olympic biathletes of Lithuania